Night Sights, also known as The Void, is a 2011 science fiction drama film.

Plot 
After losing his son, a grieving father stumbles upon a network of people that collect souls of the deceased, preparing them for their journey out of Purgatory.

Cast 
 Jonathon Lamer as Rich Hadley
 Beth Pennington as Grace
 Tom Virtue as Secretary Stirling
 Lawrence Long as Andrew
 Theresa Layne as Jamie Hadley
 Peter Buitenhek as Palatier
 Jerry Monroe as Lou Demoine
 Robin Blaze as Jermaine
 Charles Maze as Mr. Gibbons
 Criston Mitchel as Mr. Whales

External links

References 

2011 films
American science fiction drama films
2010s science fiction drama films
Fiction about purgatory
2011 drama films
2010s English-language films
2010s American films